Two ships of the Royal Navy have been named HMS Verbena:

  was an  launched in 1915 and sold for scrap in 1933
  was a  launched in 1940 and scrapped in 1951

Royal Navy ship names